Shaban Khalifa (16 February 1959 – March 2022) was an Egyptian volleyball player. He competed in the men's tournament at the 1984 Summer Olympics.

References

External links
 

1959 births
2022 deaths
Egyptian men's volleyball players
Olympic volleyball players of Egypt
Volleyball players at the 1984 Summer Olympics
Place of birth missing